Tom Norris (born July 11, 1991) is an American Grammy Award-winning mix engineer, producer, sound designer, mastering engineer, and songwriter from Los Angeles, California. Norris is best known for his mixing and production work for several prominent artists in the music industry, including Lady Gaga, Skrillex, Zedd, Grey, The Weeknd, Travis Scott, Grimes, Kendrick Lamar, and Mariah Carey, among others.

Awards and nominations

Grammy Awards 

!
|-
| rowspan="2" |2019
| rowspan="2" |The Middle (as mixer)
| Record of the Year
|
|rowspan="19"|
|-
| Best Pop Duo/Group Performance
|
|-
|2020
| Midnight Hour (as mixer)
| Best Dance Recording
|
|-
|2021
| Chromatica (as mixer)
| Best Pop Vocal Album
|
|-
|2021
| Rain On Me (as mixer)
| Best Pop Duo/Group Performance
|
|-
|2022
| Fallen Embers (as mixer)
| Best Dance/Electronic Album
|
|-
|2022
| Shockwave (as mixer)
| Best Dance/Electronic Album
|

iHeartRadio Music Awards 

!
|-
|2019
| The Middle (as mixer)
| Song of the Year
|
|rowspan="19"|

Billboard Music Awards 

!
|-
|2019
| The Middle (as mixer)
| Top Dance/Electronic Song
|
|rowspan="19"|

Discography

References

1991 births
Living people
Record producers from California
Record producers from Massachusetts
21st-century American musicians